Marcel Granollers and Horacio Zeballos defeated Nikola Mektić and Mate Pavić in the final, 1–6, 6–3, [10–8], to win the men's doubles tennis title at the 2021 Madrid Open. It was the third-seeded duo's third ATP Tour Masters 1000 doubles title together. Mektić and Pavić were contending to be the first doubles team in five years to win a season's first three Masters 1000 events.

Jean-Julien Rojer and Horia Tecău were the defending champions from when the tournament was last held in 2019, though they returned to defend their title with different partners. Rojer partnered with Marcelo Melo but lost in the second round to Tim Pütz and Alexander Zverev. Tecău partnered with Kevin Krawietz and lost to Ivan Dodig and Filip Polášek, also in the second round.

Pavić and Robert Farah were in contention for the ATP No. 1 doubles ranking at the start of the tournament. Pavić retained the top ranking after Farah lost in the second round.

Seeds
The top four seeds received a bye into the second round.

Draw

Finals

Top half

Bottom half

ATP doubles main-draw entrants

Seeds

Rankings are as of April 26, 2021.

Other entrants
The following pairs received wildcards into the doubles main draw: 
  Alejandro Davidovich Fokina /  Fernando Verdasco
  Marc López /  Jaume Munar
  Petros Tsitsipas /  Stefanos Tsitsipas
The following pair received entry into the doubles draw as alternate:
  Raven Klaasen /  Ben McLachlan

Withdrawals
Before the tournament
  Borna Ćorić /  Franko Škugor → replaced by  Márton Fucsovics /  Casper Ruud
  Alejandro Davidovich Fokina /  Fernando Verdasco → replaced by  Raven Klaasen /  Ben McLachlan

References

External links
Main draw

Men's Doubles